Marodi Jeh is an administrative region (gobol) in western Somaliland. It is the most populous region of the country. It is bordered by Awdal to the west, Sahil to the north, Togdheer to the east and Ethiopia to the south. Marodi Jeh was created by splitting the previously existing region (gobolka) Woqooyi Galbeed in two, the other part being Sahil. In 2007 the region of Woqooyi Galbeed was renamed to Maroodi Jeex (Chapter 1, Article 2 [23]). Woqooyi Galbeed was thus much larger than Marodi Jeh.

Etymology

The Marodi Jeh region (meaning "split elephant" in Somali) corresponds with the historical name of the Tog Maroodi Jeex, a seasonal river that flows through the region during the rainy season:

Hargeisa is situated on the Tug Marodijeh, the banks of which are well wooded, and as it can boast of an excellent climate all the year round, and is about half-way on the main route from Bulhar to Jig-jigga on the Abyssinian frontier, it is always likely to be of some importance to caravans. A large percentage of the trade from Ogadayn passes through it to Bulhar on the coast.

History 
Formerly known as the Hargeisa District, it was one of six districts that made up the British Somaliland protectorate. In 1960, the then independent State of Somaliland merged with Italian Somaliland to form the Somali Republic. By 1964, the then Hargeisa District merged with the Borama district (now Awdal) and the Berbera district (now Sahil) to form the Woqooyi Galbeed region (literally North West, also known as Hargeisa region).

Borama district (now Awdal) was carved out of the western parts of Woqooyi Galbeed region in June 1984. When the Somali Civil War broke out, the former British territory declared the revival of the pre-independent State of Somaliland. In 1991 Berbera district (now Sahil) was carved out of the northern parts of Woqooyi Galbeed region.

In 2007 the region of Woqooyi Galbeed was renamed to Maroodi Jeh (Chapter 1, Article 2 [23]. ]).

Overview
Marodi Jeh is bordered by Ethiopia to the south, the region of Awdal to the west, and Togdheer to the east. Its capital is Hargeisa. It is known to be a very strategic region with rich farmlands and large ports. It also contains the town of Toon, the traditional seat of the Isaaq Sultanate.

Demographics
According to the Somaliland Ministry of National Planning, Marodi Jeh had a population of 334,953 in 1997.

Marodi Jeh is inhabited by people from the Somali ethnic group, with the Arap, Ayub, Garhajis, Habr Awal and Tol Je'lo clans of the wider Isaaq clan-family residing in the region.

Districts
The Marodi Jeh region consists of 4 major and 6 minor districts:

 Hargeisa District (A)
 Baligubadle District (C)
 Salahlay District (C)
 Faraweyne District (D)
 Sabawanaag District (D)
 Adadley District (D)
 Daarasalaam District (D)
 Allaybaday District (D)
 Da'ar buduq District (D)

Map

See also
Administrative divisions of Somaliland
Regions of Somaliland
Districts of Somaliland
Somalia–Somaliland border

References

External links

Administrative map of Woqooyi Galbeed

 
Regions of Somaliland